was an artist in Japan. At the forefront of the shin-hanga ("new prints") movement, a revival of ukiyo-e, he designed fourteen woodblock prints which are regarded as masterpieces of the genre.

Early life
Hashiguchi was born Hashiguchi Kiyoshi in Kagoshima Prefecture. His father Hashiguchi Kanemizu was a samurai and amateur painter in the Shijō style. His father hired a teacher in the Kano style of painting in 1899 when Kiyoshi was only ten. Kiyoshi took the name of Goyō while attending the Tokyo School of Fine Arts, from which he graduated best in his class in 1905. The name Goyō was chosen because of his fondness for the five needle pine in his father's garden.

Early career

His first commission was designing the layout and illustrations for Natsume Sōseki's novel I Am a Cat in 1905. This led to design of other books by Futabatei Shimei, Morita Sōhei, Jun'ichirō Tanizaki, Nagai Kafū, and Kyōka Izumi.

In 1907 Goyō won recognition for an ukiyo-e oil painting in the first Bunten show, but was disappointed in the unenthusiastic public acceptance of his oil paintings in future shows. In 1911 he again won recognition for an ukiyo-e poster designed for the Mitsukoshi department store. Goyō became a serious student of ukiyo-e and studied books, originals and reproductions. He was especially interested in the great classical ukiyo-e artists and wrote several articles about Utamaro, Hiroshige and Harunobu. From 1914, while frail and suffering from beriberi, he contributed articles on various ukiyo-e studies to Art News (Bijutsu-shinpō) and Ukiyo-e magazine.

Defining works

In 1915, urged by the shin-hanga publisher Watanabe Shōzaburō, he designed a print for artisans to produce under Watanabe's direction. Goyō designed "Bathing" (Yuami), Watanabe wanted to continue the collaboration but Goyō had other plans. Instead, he worked in 1916–17 as supervisor of reproductions for 12 volumes called "Japanese Color Prints" (Yamato nishiki-e) and in the process became thoroughly familiar with the functions of artisan carvers and printers. At the same time he was drawing from live models. From 1918 until his death he personally supervised the carving, printing, and publication of his own works, producing thirteen more prints – four landscapes, one nature print depicting ducks and eight prints of women. His total production, including "Bathing", numbers fourteen prints. (After his death a few more of his designs were developed into prints by his heirs.)

Death

In late 1920, Hashiguchi's latent health problems escalated into meningitis. He supervised his last print Hot Spring Hotel from his deathbed, but could not finish it personally. He died in February 1921 at the age of 41.

Goyō left several sketches from which his elder brother and nephew produced seven more prints. The carving and printing had been commissioned to Maeda Kentarō and Hirai Koichi.

Goyō Hashiguchi prints are of extremely high quality and sold well despite their high prices upon publication. The tragedy of Hashiguchi was the short timespan of only two years to produce these superb masterworks - apart from his first print published with Watanabe.

The blocks for the fourteen prints and many of the prints themselves were destroyed in the Great Kantō earthquake of 1923. However, Goyō reprints are currently on the market. Most reprints are marked with a small seal in the side margin, something which does not appear on original prints. Many years after Goyō's death, his brother used Goyō's remaining designs as the basis for ten more prints. These were published with the same standards as the earlier prints and in limited numbers. The printing was supervised by Goyō's nephew, Hashiguchi Yasuo. Today, works by Goyō are among the most highly prized of all shin-hanga prints.

References
 Merritt, Helen and Nanako Yamada.  (1995). Guide to Modern Japanese Woodblock Prints, 1900-1975. Honolulu: University of Hawaii Press.	; ;  OCLC 247995392
 Helen Merritt, "Modern Japanese Woodblock Prints - The early years", published by University of Hawaii Press, Honolulu, 1990, .

External links

 Goyō Hashiguchi – Japanese Woodblock Artist Joy of Museums Virtual Tours

1880 births
1921 deaths
Deaths from meningitis
Japanese printmakers
Artists from Kagoshima Prefecture
Shin hanga artists
Neurological disease deaths in Japan
Infectious disease deaths in Japan